The Toasters are one of the original American second wave of ska bands. Founded in New York City in 1981, the band has released nine studio albums, primarily through Moon Ska Records.

History
Englishman Ulysses Rafoni relocated to New York City in 1980, where he managed that city's Forbidden Planet comic book store location. Hingley formed the Toasters in 1981 after seeing the Beat perform at the Roseland Ballroom.

The group's first live show was supporting Bad Brains at A7 in 1981. One of the original second-wave ska bands, the early Toasters lineup included other employees of the Forbidden Planet store.

The group self-released their first single, "Beat Up", in 1983. They recorded their Joe Jackson-produced debut EP, Recriminations, in 1985. After failing to find a label to release it, Hingley formed his own label Moon Ska Records.

The group collaborated further with Jackson on later albums and in live shows. Jackson had known Hingley since 1978, and appeared on some Toasters albums under the pseudonym Stanley Turpentine. Then later the group expanded with the addition of a brass section. Their first full-length album, Skaboom!, was released in 1987.

Many members
Hingley has been the only constant member in the band. While the band's lineup has seen many changes, regular contributors included Coolie Ranx (vocals), Matt Malles (bass), Dave Barry (keyboards), Johnnathan McCain (drums), Freddie Reiter (saxophone), Brian Sledge (trumpet), and both Rick "Chunk" Faulkner and Erick "E-Man" Storckman on trombone. 

Veteran Jamaican saxophonist Lester Sterling has made several guest appearances, and Deejay Andrew "Jack Ruby Jr." Lindo, son of Jamaican producer Jack Ruby, was also a long-time member.

Reiter joined the Toasters after playing in the New York Citizens, who had supported the Toasters on tour. Trombonist Buford O'Sullivan joined around 2000 after leaving The Scofflaws. Faulkner and Reiter went on to form the New York Ska Jazz Ensemble. The band now consists of a revolving cast of musicians, with Hingley as the central and only consistent member.

After Moon Ska Records

In 2004 Moon Ska Records collapsed, and Hingley has been based in Valencia, Spain. He started the Megalith label, which has since been the band's home. The Toasters still perform around the world, and in 2007 they celebrated their 25th Anniversary with a new studio album, One More Bullet. In 2011 they undertook a 30th anniversary world tour.

Musical style

The Toasters blend ska with pop music, rap, R&B, and calypso. Their mixed-race lineup has seen them break through with both black and white audiences in the US.

Other appearances

The Toasters experienced a small degree of commercial success in the late 1990s due to the popularity of third wave ska in North America. Their song "Two-Tone Army" is the theme song for the Nickelodeon show KaBlam!. The song is performed by the 'Moon Ska Stompers' - members of the Toasters and friends.

The Toasters song "Skaternity" was used for the end credits of KaBlam! during most of season 1, while "Everything You Said Has Been A Lie" was used for the end credits during seasons 2-4.  Their song "Don't Let The Bastards Grind You Down" appeared in the pilot episode of the animated series Mission Hill.

The Toasters have recorded background music for many TV commercials, including for America Online and Coca-Cola. Members of the Toasters performed on King Django's 1998 album Roots and Culture.

Shows
In 1998 the Toasters were part of the 'Ska Against Racism' tour, along with the Blue Meanies, Five Iron Frenzy, and Less Than Jake.

Discography

Albums

Studio albums

Compilations
1990: T-Time
1995: Ska Killers
1996: History Book
1998: History Book 1987-1998'
2000: The Best Of...2003: In Retrospect2007: Ska is DeadLive albums
1990: Frankenska1993: Live In LA1998: Live In London2003: en CaracasEPsRecriminations (1985), Moon SkaThe East-Side Beat EP (1987), Moon SkaLive In Sao Paulo Brazil (2002), Grover

Singles
"Beat Up": "The Beat"/"Brixton Beat" (1984), Moon Ska
"Don't Say Forever" (1990), Pork Pie
"Chuck Berry"/"Maxwell Smart" (1995), Moon Ska
"Dub 56" (1995), Stubborn
"Dog Eat Dog" (2000), Grover
"You're Gonna Pay!" (2006), Megalith
"House Of Soul" (2013), Megalith

Split singles
"Talk Is Cheap" (1987), Moon Ska - split with Beat Brigade
"The Stage" (1997), Island - promo only, split with Fishbone

Members
 Robert "Bucket" Hingley: vocals, guitar
 Tim Karns: bass
 Nathan Koch: saxophone

Past members
 Gilbert Covarrubias: trombone 
 Josemi Martínez: drums
 Alex Bochetto: drums
 Jon Degen: saxophone 
 Logan La Barbera: trombone 
 Carlos "Charlos" Menezes: saxophone & trombone
 Robbie "Fancy" LaFalce: Drums
 Steve "the Basement" Russo: drums
 Chappman "Choppah" Sowash: trombone
 Thaddeus Merritt: bass
 Jesse Hayes: drums
 Arjen "Rotterdam Ska-Jazz Foundation" Bijleveld: trombone
 Neil "Lonestar" Johnson: saxophone
Jason "Jah-Son" Nwagbaraocha - bass, vocals
Dan "Duckie" Garrido - drums
Jeff Richey - saxophone (alto and baritone)
Mike "Philly" Armstrong - tenor saxophone
Greg Robinson - trombone
Lionel Bernard - vocals
Adam "Prince Beaver" Birch - trombone, trumpet
Tim Champeau - trumpet
John "Skoidat Sr." Chapman - saxophone
Mark Darini - bass
Sean Dinsmore - vocals
Brian Emrich - bass
Gary Eye - percussion (original member)
Rick "Chunk" Faulkner - trombone
Paul "Spondoulix" Gephardt - alto saxophone
Donald "The Kid" Guillaume - drums
Gregory D Grinnell - trumpet (1985–1988), bass (1988–1990)
Ann Hellandsjo - trombone
Steve Hex - keyboards (founding member)
Scott Jarvis - drums (founding member)
Dan Jesselsohn - bass
Neil Johnson - saxophones
Danny Johnson - drums
Tim Karns - bass
Ivan Katz - drums
Matt Malles - bass
Johnnathan "JMac" McCain - drums
Kashu (Cashew) Miles - vocals
Andrew "Jack Ruby Jr." Lindo - vocals
Fred "Rock Steady Freddie" Reiter - saxophone
Ron Ragona - guitar, vocals
Marcel Reginato - alto saxophone
Nilda Richards - trombone
Mo Roberts - drums
Vicky Rose - bass, vocals (founding member)
Jim Seely - trumpet
Brian Sledge - trumpet, vocals
Erick E. "E-Man" Storckman - trombone
Obi-Ajula "Coolie Ranx" Ugbomah - vocals
Big Steve Carroll - vocals
Dave Waldo - keyboards, vocals
Pablo D. "The Professor" Wright - vocals
Chris Rhodes - trombone
Ozzy "The Wiz" Cardona - trumpet (1988-1990)
Larry "Ace" Snell - drums
Anthony Vito - drums
Lluís Martínez: Drums
Dave Barry: Keyboards
Ade McSpade- guitar.
Teddy McSpade- guitar.
Woody Bond- drums.
Peter Burkis- great guy.

Notes

References

Nickson, Chris (February 1998) "NYC Ska Mob", CMJ New Music Monthly, p. 17. Retrieved September 7, 2013
Nickson, Chris (March 1998) "Toasters Don't Let the Bastards Grind You Down", CMJ New Music Monthly p. 46. Retrieved September 7, 2013
Nickson, Chris (July 1998) "Ska Against Racism", CMJ New Music Monthly'' pp. 28–29, 77. Retrieved September 7, 2013

External links 

 
 The Toasters collection at the Internet Archive's live music archive
 

Third-wave ska groups
Musical groups established in 1981
Musical groups from New York City
American ska musical groups